Club Soccer Longueuil is a Canadian semi-professional soccer club based in Longueuil, Quebec. Since 2014, the club has competed in the Première Ligue de soccer du Québec.

History
The club was originally founded in 1970. In 2014, the club joined the Première Ligue de soccer du Québec, a Division III league, fielding a team in the men's division.  They had a successful debut season, winning the league championship and advancing to the final of the League Cup, where they lost in the final to FC Gatineau. By winning the league title, they participated in the first Inter-Provincial Cup against the champion of League1 Ontario to determine the Canadian Division III champion, in 2014. In the Inter-Provincial Cup, in 2014, they faced League1 Ontario champions Toronto FC Academy,  who defeated them over the two-legged fixture, losing the first leg at home 4-0 to TFCA and drawing the second leg away 0-0. By 2016, however, their budget was slashed in half, requiring them to field rosters with a greater number of young players.

In 2020, they had decided to add a team in the women's division of the Première Ligue de soccer du Québec. However, the 2020 season was postponed due to the COVID-19 pandemic. While some clubs opted out of the season upon the league restart, the club decided to remain part of the league and compete.

Seasons 
Men

Women

Notable former players
The following players have either played at the professional or international level, either before or after playing for the PLSQ team:

Men

Women

Honours
Première Ligue de soccer du Québec
PLSQ Championship: 2014

References

External links 
 Official website (in French)
 Official website (in English)

Longueuil
Longueuil
Soccer clubs in Quebec
Sport in Longueuil
1970 establishments in Quebec